The 1370s BC refers to the period between 1379 BC and 1370 BC, the 1370s was the third decade of the 14th century BC.

Events and trends
 The cutting down of the oak log that the Egtved Girl (in today's Denmark) was buried in. It is dated to the summer of 1370 BC.
 c. 1375 BC—Minoan culture ends on Crete.
 c. 1375 BC—Site of palace complex Knossos is abandoned.
 1378 BC—Old Assyrian Empire disestablished.

Significant people
 Akhenaten is thought to have been born in this decade.
 Nefertiti is thought to have been born in this decade.

References